Keith Whitfield is an American psychologist, educator and gerontologist,  is the President of University of Nevada-Las Vegas. He became the 11th and first black president of the University   when he was appointed on August 24, 2020. Prior to the position, he was the Provost and Senior Vice President of Academic Affairs and a professor of Psychology at Wayne State University.

Education 
Mr. Whitfield got his BA from the Santa Fe College in 1984. He got his MA from Texas Tech University in 1987. In 1989, he got his Ph.D. from Texas Tech University. He has an expertise in psychology of cognition and healthy aging, stress and aging among African Americans, health disparities research.

Career 
In 2011, he was appointed as the vice provost for academic affairs at Duke University. While at Duke University, he held appointments as professor in the Department of Psychology and Neuroscience, research professor in the Department of Geriatric Medicine at Duke University Medical Center, and senior fellow at the Center for the Study of Aging and Human Development. He also was the co-director of the Center on Biobehavioral Health Disparities Research. He became provost and senior vice president for academic affairs at Wayne State University in 2016 before moving on to University of Nevada-Las Vegas in 2020.

In his first address as president of University of Nevada-Las Vegas. Mr. Whitfield introduced Top Tier 2.0 as a roadmap for the university to improve its Carnegie R1 status. During his time as president, Mr. Whitfield has shown his interest in create additional partnerships with gaming companies for the university's research and technology park in August 2021. Mr. Whitfield is also mediating between The Boring Company and their plans to build a Loop station at the school's campus.  In January 2021, Mr. Whitfield announced the university was dropping it's "Hey Reb!" mascot after perceived ties with the Confederacy.

References 

American gerontologists
American geriatricians
Year of birth missing (living people)
Living people
Heads of universities and colleges in the United States
Presidents of the University of Nevada, Las Vegas